Premio Casa de América de Poesía Americana (Casa de América Prize for American Poetry) is a literary prize awarded by the  public consortium, "in order to stimulate new poetic writing in the Americas, with special attention to poems that open up or explore new perspectives and renovate themes". The prize, which awards unpublished works, has among its list of winners several important contemporary Latin American poets such as Yolanda Pantin, Piedad Bonnett, Carmen Boullosa, Eduardo Chirinos, and Rafael Courtoisie.

Award winners

References

Poetry awards
Latin American literary awards